Disarm is a documentary film which spans a dozen countries to look at how, despite a global ban, millions of antipersonnel landmines continue to claim victims daily in more than eighty countries. Defined as a conventional weapon, landmines inflict destruction upon civilian populations for decades after the initial conflict has ended. Disarm juxtaposes government and public opinion- that of diplomats, mine victims, deminers, soldiers, campaigners and aid workers- to explore the issues that both hinder and further the case against the weapon. Visually stunning, Disarm features harrowing footage smuggled out of isolated nation of Burma, scenes from war-ravaged Colombia and Iraq, never-before-seen helmet camera footage shot by Afghan and Bosnian deminers, unprecedented access into warehouses stockpiling millions of Soviet-made mines, and insightful comments by outspoken Nobel Peace Laureate Jody Williams. Looking beyond landmines, Disarm offers a contemporary, intelligent and critical investigation into how weapons systems, war, and the way it is waged are being redefined in the 21st century with devastating consequences.

References

External links 
http://www.indiepixfilms.com/film/3610
http://www.disarmfilm.org/
http://www.documentaryfilms.net/index.php/disarm/

2005 films
Documentary films about war
Films shot in Myanmar
Films shot in Colombia
Films shot in Iraq
Films shot in Afghanistan
Films shot in Bosnia and Herzegovina
2000s English-language films